Ptelea is a genus of flowering plants in the citrus family, Rutaceae. The name, of Greek derivation, is the classical name of the elm tree. Carl Linnaeus used that word for this genus because of the resemblance of its fruit to that of the elm. Members of the genus are commonly known as hoptrees.

Species
Ptelea aptera Parry
Ptelea crenulata Greene — California hoptree
Ptelea trifoliata L. — Common hoptree
Ptelea trifoliata subsp. angustifolia (Benth.) V.L.Bailey
Ptelea trifoliata subsp. coahuilensis (Greene) V.L.Bailey
Ptelea trifoliata f. fastigiata (Bean) Rehder
Ptelea trifoliata subsp. pallida (Greene) V.L.BaileyPtelea trifoliata subsp. polyadenia (Greene) V.L.BaileyPtelea trifoliata f. pubescens (Pursh) VossPtelea trifoliata subsp. trifoliataFormerly placed hereCliftonia monophylla (Lam.) Britton ex Sarg. (as P. monophylla Lam.)
Dodonaea viscosa subsp. angustifolia (L.f.) J.G.West (as P. viscosa'' L.)

References

External links

Zanthoxyloideae
Zanthoxyloideae genera